Ysaline Bonaventure and Nicola Slater were the defending champions, but decided not to participate this year.

Mihaela Buzărnescu and Justyna Jegiołka won the title, defeating Sharon Fichman and Maria Sanchez 7–6(8–6), 4–6, [10–7] in the final.

Seeds

Draw

References
Main Draw

Challenger Banque Nationale de Saguenay
Challenger de Saguenay